Kamil Myaskutovich Zakirov (born 15 November 1998) is a Russian football player who plays for Tver.

Club career
He made his debut in the Russian Professional Football League for FC Anzhi-2 Makhachkala on 10 March 2018 in a game against FC Akademiya Futbola Rostov-on-Don.

He made his Russian Premier League debut for FC Anzhi Makhachkala on 1 March 2019 in a game against FC Orenburg, as a starter.

On 13 June 2019, he signed a 4-year contract with FC Rubin Kazan. On 21 February 2020, he joined FC Volgar Astrakhan on loan until the end of the 2019–20 season. On 30 August 2020, he joined FC Minsk on loan until 15 December 2020.

References

External links
 
 
 

1998 births
Sportspeople from Ulyanovsk
Living people
Russian footballers
Association football midfielders
FC Krasnodar players
FC Anzhi Makhachkala players
FC Rubin Kazan players
FC Volgar Astrakhan players
FC Minsk players
FC Dynamo Saint Petersburg players
Russian Premier League players
Russian Second League players
Belarusian Premier League players
Latvian Higher League players
Russian expatriate footballers
Expatriate footballers in Belarus
Expatriate footballers in Latvia